Louis de Bourbon, Count of Montpensier (1483 – August 14, 1501, Naples) was the son of Gilbert, Count of Montpensier and Claire Gonzaga. He was Count of Montpensier and Clermont-en-Auvergne and Dauphin d'Auvergne from 1496 to his death.

He died unmarried and was succeeded by his brother Charles III, Duke of Bourbon.

Bourbon-Montpensier, Louis II of
Bourbon-Montpensier, Louis II of
House of Bourbon-Montpensier
Bourbon-Montpensier, Louis II of Bourbon, comte de
Bourbon-Montpensier, Gilbert de
Bourbon-Montpensier, Gilbert de
15th-century peers of France
16th-century peers of France